West African Football Academy (WAFA) Sporting Club is a Ghanaian professional football club based near Sogakope in the Volta Region that was founded by Feyenoord from Rotterdam. They are competing in the Ghana Premier League. Apply now: 0556810592. The 2016–17 season was a successful one for WAFA as the side finished second in the Premier League, beating Hearts of Oak 5–0 along the way.

History
Feyenoord's chairman Jorien van den Herik was given permission for the opening of Feyenoord's own football academy in the Ghanaian settlement of Gomoa Fetteh, just outside the capital Accra. The go-ahead was given by the Chief of Fetteh in 1998 and the academy was opened in October 1999. At Feyenoord Academy, young talented African footballers could work on their football skills. In addition to helping their football potential the students were provided with formal education which was funded by Feyenoord. The idea for Feyenoord's own football academy was formed in Abidjan.

Van den Herik signed the then still unknown Bonaventure Kalou and got into contact with the education institute at Kalou's club.  That same year the head of the education institute flew to Africa to take stock of the project and returned with a praising report. In January 1998, Feyenoord started its own Football School in Africa.

Mohammed Abubakari was the first player that graduated from the academy and achieved a professional contract at Feyenoord. Before Abubakari's move, Jordan Opoku spent some time at Excelsior and Antwerp before returning to Ghana. In the buildup to the 2008–09 season, right-back Harrison Afful went on trial with Feyenoord, but was not offered a contract.

In August 2014, Feyenoord Academy was rebranded to the name West African Football Academy. In the same year, the club took over the old Red Bull Academy near Sogakope and moved from their old location in Gomoa Fetteh to this new location in the Volta Region.

Current squad

Academy

Club captains 

 Jordan Opoku (2003) (2005–06)

 Gideon Waja (2016–2017)

 Mohammed Alhassan (2017–2018)

 Ibrahim Abukari (2019–)

Managerial history 

  Saddiq Abubakari (2018)

  Prosper Nartey Ogum (2020–present)

Satellite clubs
The following clubs are affiliated with Feyenoord Gomoa Fetteh:
  ASEC Mimosas
  Feyenoord

Gallery

Seasons 
2020 -21 West African Football Academy season

References

External links
 Official club page

Football clubs in Ghana
1998 establishments in Ghana
Football academies in Africa
Volta Region
Association football clubs established in 1998